The Men's Individual AR2 was an archery competition in the 1992 Summer Paralympics.

Italian gold medalist, Orazio Pizzorni, defeated the German archer Hermann Nortmann in the final. The bronze medal match was won by Nortmann's countryman Udo Wolf.

Results

Qualifying round

Finals

References

Men's individual AR2